Billy Sands (January 6, 1911 – August 27, 1984) was an American character actor who appeared as a regular on The Phil Silvers Show (Sgt Bilko) as Pvt. Dino Papparelli and was a regular on McHale's Navy as Harrison "Tinker" Bell. He also made guest-starring roles on many other television series, including Car 54, Where Are You?, All in the Family, Here's Lucy, Happy Days, and The Odd Couple. Sands also appears in one of the opening scenes of Rocky as a booker for the fighters.

Personal life and death 
Born William F. Sands in Bergen, New York to Samuel & Henrietta Epstein, he began his professional career in 1946 when he appeared on Broadway with Spencer Tracy in Robert E. Sherwood's Rugged Path.

Sands died of lung cancer at age 73 at UCLA Medical Center in Los Angeles, on August 27, 1984, and was buried at Hillside Memorial Park Cemetery in Culver City, California. He was survived by his wife Marsha, daughter Susan, son Eugene, two sisters and a brother.

Partial filmography 
McHale's Navy (1964) - Motor Machinist Mate Harrison Bell
McHale's Navy Joins the Air Force (1965) - Motor Machinist Mate Harrison Bell
The Reluctant Astronaut (1967) - Airport Announcer / Man Mopping Floor in Film (uncredited)
P.J. (1968) - Barber (uncredited)
The Love God? (1969) - Barber (uncredited)
How to Frame a Figg (1971) - Bowling Alley Manager
Another Nice Mess (1972) - Interpreter
The Harrad Experiment (1973) - Jack
Rocky (1976) - Club Fight Announcer
The World's Greatest Lover (1977) - Guard
High Anxiety (1977) - Customer
Serial (1980) - Bartender

References

External links 

Rotten Tomatoes profile

1911 births
1984 deaths
American male television actors
20th-century American male actors
Burials at Hillside Memorial Park Cemetery
Deaths from lung cancer in California
Jewish American male actors
People from Bergen, New York
Male actors from New York (state)
20th-century American Jews